The Contender is a 1944 American film directed by Sam Newfield. The film is also known as Challenger (American TV title)

Cast
Buster Crabbe as Gary Farrel
Arline Judge as Linda Martin
Julie Gibson as Rita Langdon
Donald Mayo as Mickey Farrel
Glenn Strange as Biff Benham
Milton Kibbee as "Pop" Turner
Roland Drew as Kip Morgan
Sam Flint as Major Palmer
George Turner as Sparky Callahan
Duke York as "Bomber" Brown
Jimmy Aubrey as Dance Club Drunk

External links

1944 films
1940s sports films
American boxing films
1940s English-language films
American black-and-white films
1944 crime drama films
1944 romantic drama films
Producers Releasing Corporation films
American romantic drama films
Films scored by Albert Glasser
American crime drama films
Films directed by Sam Newfield
1940s American films